Simon Stone (born 19 August 1984) is an Australian film and theatre director, writer and actor.

Early life
Stone is Australian, but was born in Basel and grew up in Cambridge and Melbourne. His father, Stuart Stone, was a biochemist and his mother, Eleanor Mackie, a veterinary scientist. Stuart Stone died of a heart attack aged 45; Stone, aged 12, witnessed it, and has spoken about the ways in which that trauma has influenced his work.

Career

Director/writer
In 2007 Stone founded the independent theatre company The Hayloft Project and adapted and directed their inaugural production of Frank Wedekind's Spring Awakening. This production was remounted in 2008 at Belvoir St Theatre and was described in The Sydney Morning Herald as "a lean, contained, ultimately furious, liberating production that is well-attuned to Wedekind's poetic rhythms, wit and pubescent discoveries". Other productions Stone adapted and directed for The Hayloft Project include Platonov, 3xSisters, The Suicide and The Only Child, a new version of Henrik Ibsen's Little Eyolf which won the Sydney Theatre Award for Best Independent Production.

In 2009 he directed Aleksei Arbuzov's The Promise for Belvoir. In 2010 he directed and co-wrote with Mark Leonard Winter, Thomas Henning and Chris Ryan a version of Seneca's Thyestes for The Hayloft Project and Malthouse Theatre, Melbourne. He directed The Cherry Orchard for Melbourne Theatre Company in 2013.

In 2011 Stone became the resident director at Belvoir. In his first year he wrote and directed The Wild Duck, after Henrik Ibsen, which has become his calling card production and has played internationally, including at the Holland Festival. In 2011 he also directed Robyn Nevin in Lally Katz's Neighbourhood Watch for Belvoir and adapted and directed Bertolt Brecht's Baal for the Sydney Theatre Company.

For Theater Basel, where he was a house director from 2015, he has directed Angels in America, John Gabriel Borkman (for which he won the 2015 Nestroy Theatre Prize), Three Sisters, and Korngold's opera Die tote Stadt. A companion project with the works of August Strindberg, Hotel Strindberg, premiered at Theater Basel in 2018.

For Ivo van Hove's company Internationaal Theater Amsterdam, he has directed Euripides' Medea in his own new adaptation, Husbands and Wives, Ibsen House, a new play by Stone which threads together the plots of several of Ibsen's plays in a new modern scenario, and Flight 49, inspired by the novel Op Hoop van Zegen by Herman Heijermans.

In 2016, Stone premiered an adaptation of Federico García Lorca's Yerma at the Young Vic in London. The production starred Billie Piper in the title role, and was well reviewed, returning for a second run in 2017 before transferring to the Park Avenue Armory in New York in 2018. It won the Laurence Olivier Award for Best Revival in 2017.

Stone directed Luigi Cherubini's opera Médée at the 2019 Salzburg Festival. He took his production of Euripides' Medea, with Rose Byrne and Bobby Cannavale, to the Brooklyn Academy of Music in 2020. He made his debut at the Metropolitan Opera in New York in 2022 with Donizetti's Lucia di Lammermoor, set in present-day America's Rust Belt.

His updated adaptation of Phaedra was produced at the National Theatre February to April 2023; the company included Mackenzie Davis, Assaad Bouab and Janet McTeer.

Stone has acted in the television series John Safran's Music Jamboree, MDA, Blue Heelers, Rush, City Homicide, and the films Jindabyne, Kokoda, Balibo, Blame, and The Eye of the Storm.

Film

Stone's directorial debut film The Daughter premiered at the 2015 Toronto International Film Festival and was released in Australia on 17 March 2016 and he won Best Adapted Screenplay at the AACTA Awards.

He directed the British drama film The Dig in 2021. It focuses on an archaeological dig in Sutton Hoo in 1939.

Personal life

Stone married Jessamy Dyer in 2004 though the marriage ended in divorce. He has since married again. His current wife is Stefanie Hackl, a dramaturg.

Philosophy

Stone likes to take pieces from the standard theatre canon which, with the help of his cast, he reworks into intimate, almost cinematic performances. He often works from improvisation creating an entirely new script through which the original play nevertheless shines. This practice is sometimes referred to as "over-writing".

Stone believes in theatre as a place for polemic: "One can't make theatre based on fear and compromises. Without argument, there is no art."

Yet, at the same time, he acknowledges that his own art has its roots in finding a language for the trauma of his father's death. "I certainly couldn't talk to people about what had happened to me. Especially at a young age, people are very confronted by 'how on earth do I even talk about that absurdly dark thing that happened to Simon?'. Of course, in cinema and literature, you find conversation partners. They're not talking back but they kind of are because they're telling you you're not the only person who's been through that thing."

References

External links
 

1984 births
Living people
Australian theatre directors
Australian film directors
Australian opera directors
Australian television actors
Australian male film actors